Anna Sokolina, PhD (née Anna Petrovna Guz) is an American architect, scholar, and curator, Routledge featured author, founding chair of Women in Architecture Affiliate Group (SAH WiA AG) of the Society of Architectural Historians (SAH) and of SAH WiA AG Legacy Committee, founder and co-chair of SAH WiA AG Registers Committee, Advisory Board member of The Bloomsbury Global Encyclopaedia of Women in Architecture (ed. Lori A. Brown and Karen Burns, forthcoming), and of H-SHERA Network, first elected honorary advisor serving on the Board of Advisors of the International Archive of Women in Architecture (IAWA).

Sokolina published over one hundred research papers, academic reviews and reports, chaired sessions and presented at 85 academic conferences, and received eighteen grants and recognitions. Her research is focused on women's contribution to the integral field of the built environment, on the interdisciplinary inquiry to advocating women's work across borders, and on holistic genealogies and trajectories of global transitions in architecture. Other areas of study include Paper Architecture, architecture and utopia, architecture and spiritual science. Among her publications are: The Routledge Companion to Women in Architecture (editor and contributor, 2021), SAH Women in Architecture Bibliography (co-editor, 2021), Architecture and Anthroposophy (editor, 2001 and 2010, e-access 2019), Life to Architecture: Milka Bliznakov Scholar Report (2019, rev. ed. 2021), "Breaking the Silence" (New York and London: Routledge, 2021), and "Biology in Architecture" in The Routledge Companion to Biology in Art and Architecture (New York and London: Routledge, 2016, 2019).

Biography
Sokolina graduated from Moscow Institute of Architecture (Architecture, 1980), 
attained a PhD in Theory and History of Architecture, Landmarks Restoration and Preservation from VNIITAG, the theory/history branch of Russian Academy of Architecture and Construction Sciences (1992), and holds a Certificate in Arts Administration from New York University School of Professional Studies (2001).

She interned at the Solomon R. Guggenheim Museum, Cooper Hewitt, Smithsonian Design Museum, and New York City Public Design Commission at the NYC Mayor's Office, and has contributed on Editorial Board of Artmargins, for nine years at the Office of Research of the Metropolitan Museum of Art Education Department, and at the Morgan Library & Museum. She worked as an architect at CNIITIA, research associate at VNIITAG, and curator of exhibitions at Tabakman Museum in Hudson, NY. While a faculty member at Miami University Department of Architecture + Interior Design, she curated the Cage Architecture Gallery, served on the Council on Diversity and Inclusion, REEE Curriculum Committee, Havighurst Advisory Committee, and Post-Doctoral Fellowship Selection Committee, and organized gifts to Miami University King Library, Virginia Tech University Library Special Collections, and Sächsische Landesbibliothek and TU Dresden.

She was the first independent woman curator of itinerant Paper Architecture exhibitions in Germany and France (1992–94), with support by the Senate of Berlin, Grün Berlin GMBh, École Nationale Supérieure d'Architecture de Strasbourg (ENSAS), and Bürgerhaus Gröbenzell, interviewed in direct broadcast by Rundfunk im amerikanischen Sektor RIAS, Berlin, and was first lecturer invited after the collapse of the USSR by the European Academy of the Urban Environment EA.UE Berlin in the UNESCO Program “Sustainable Settlements" (other lecturers: Lucien Kroll, Architect, Brussel, Belgium; Elke Pahl-Weber, Dipl. Ing., City Planner, Hamburg, Germany; John Thompson, Architect, London, England; Henry Beierlorzer, Dipl. Ing., City Planner, Gelsenkirchen, Germany), 1993. In 2016–20 she served as the first Society of Architectural Historians (SAH) liaison elected to SHERA Board.

The International Archive of Women in Architecture at Virginia Tech holds a collection of her professional records, sixty publications, 29 artworks, dissertation thesis and 25 presentation boards, and correspondence with the IAWA founder Prof. Emerita Milka Bliznakov (Series VI, 39 large envelopes, multiple boxes), as well as over 25 collections of women architects that she solicited for the Archive. As an artist, she participated in nineteen exhibitions, five of them at the Metropolitan Museum of Art; her 104 artworks are housed in 23 public and private collections. She works on her book, The Utopia Code: Architecture of the GDR, on a chapter in a planned academic anthology and five encyclopedia entries, and edits the volume of the IAWA founder Milka Bliznakov, In Search for a Style: The Great Experiment in Architecture 1917–1932.

Select publications
 Sokolina, Anna, ed. The Routledge Companion to Women in Architecture. New York: Routledge, 2021. 
 Sokolina, Anna. Architecture and Anthroposophy. [Arkhitektura i Antroposofiia.] Ed., contributor, transl., photogr. Hardcover M: KMK, 2001 ; and 2010 , electronic access: BDN, 2019.
 Sokolina, Anna P. Milka Bliznakov Scholar Report. “Life to Architecture: Milka Bliznakov Academic Papers and Records of Women in Russian Architecture at the IAWA.” New Haven: alternative spaces, 2019, revised edition 2021.  Library of Congress Copyright Registration No: TXu 2-145-653.
 Sokolina, Anna P. "Biology in Architecture: The Goetheanum Case Study." In The Routledge Companion to Biology in Art and Architecture, edited by Charissa Terranova and Meredith Tromble, 52–70. New York: Routledge, 2016; 2019. 
 Sokolina, Anna. "Milka Bliznakov, 1927–2010." Slavic Review. Interdisciplinary Quarterly of Russian, Eurasian, and East European Studies 70, no.2 (2011): 498–499. 
 Sokolina, Anna. Poems [Stikhi]. Ills by author, photograph by A. Gennadiev. New York: Telex, 1998. Library of Congress Cat. No: 99232023.

References

External links 
  Sokolina, Anna, ed. The Routledge Companion to Women Architecture. New York: Routledge, 2021.  
  Anna Sokolina, page in the Dynamic National Archive (DNA) of the Beverly Willis Architectural Foundation (BWAF)
 ,  Sokolina, Anna P. "Biology in Architecture." In The Routledge Companion to Biology in Art and Architecture, eds. Carissa N. Terranova and Meredith Tromble. New York: Routledge, 2016.  New York: Routledge, 2019. 
  Sokolina, Anna, ed. Architecture and Anthroposophy. [Arkhitektura i Antroposofiia.] Hardcover, 1st edition, M.: KMK, 2001.  2nd edition M.: KMK, 2010.  
  Sokolina, Anna, ed. Architecture and Anthroposophy. E-access BDN 2019.

American women architects
Anthroposophists
Living people
Architectural historians
1956 births
Women art historians
Architects from Moscow